News from Home is a 1977 avant-garde documentary film directed by Chantal Akerman. The film consists of long takes of locations in New York City set to Akerman's voice-over as she reads letters that her mother sent her between 1971 and 1973 when Akerman lived in the city.

Production
In November 1971, at the age of 21, Belgian film director Chantal Akerman moved to New York City. There she took petty jobs, made films and befriended filmmakers such as Jonas Mekas and the cinematographer Babette Mangolte, who became one of her recurring collaborators. According to Akerman, she spent the period living "like a vagabond." Principal photography for News from Home took place in the summer of 1976, three years after Akerman had returned to Belgium and after she had achieved critical success with the 1975 film Jeanne Dielman, 23 quai du Commerce, 1080 Bruxelles. Locations chosen for News from Home correspond to the areas where Akerman used to take walks, which include the Times Square subway station and a long shot driving up Tenth Avenue from 30th to 49th Streets in Hell's Kitchen. Other scenes were filmed in Tribeca and on the Staten Island Ferry. The sound was not recorded along with the images, but was added later.

Release
The film was released on DVD in France through Carlotta Films on 18 April 2007. The Criterion Collection released it through its Eclipse series in 2010 as part of a set called Chantal Akerman in the Seventies. The set includes four feature films that Akerman directed in the 1970s as well as a number of short films. News from Home is included on the first disc of the set, called The New York Films.

See also
 List of Eclipse releases

References

External links
 
 
 

1977 films
Belgian documentary films
Documentary films about women
Films directed by Chantal Akerman
Documentary films about New York City
French documentary films
1970s French-language films
1970s avant-garde and experimental films
Women in New York City
French-language Belgian films
1970s French films